The 2012–13 Davidson Wildcats men's basketball team represents Davidson College during the 2012–13 NCAA Division I men's basketball season. The Wildcats, led by 24th year head coach Bob McKillop, play their home games at the John M. Belk Arena and are members of the Southern Conference.

Roster

Schedule

|-
!colspan=9| Exhibition

|-
!colspan=9| Regular Season

|-
!colspan=9| 2013 Southern Conference men's basketball tournament

|-
!colspan=9| 2013 NCAA tournament

References

Davidson Wildcats men's basketball seasons
Southern Conference men's basketball champion seasons
Davidson
Davidson
Davidson Wildcats men's b
Davidson Wildcats men's b